Baek A-yeon (born March 11, 1993) is a South Korean singer and songwriter signed under Eden Entertainment. She is best known as the second runner-up contestant of K-pop Star.

As a soloist, she has released a total of five extended plays and a total of ten singles, after her contract with JYP Entertainment expired in 2019, she subsequently joined EDEN Entertainment.

Early life and education
Baek was born on March 11, 1993, in Seongnam, Gyeonggi-do. During her fifth year of elementary school she underwent treatment for cancer. She is currently studying at the Department of Practical Music at Howon University.

Career

2011–2012: K-Pop Star
Baek participated in the first season of competition television show K-pop Star. She was one of the top three contestants, along with Park Ji-min and Lee Hi. After she was eliminated she was approached by a number of entertainment agencies seeking to sign her. Baek eventually signed with JYP Entertainment, the company of K-pop Star judge JYP.

2012–2014: I'm Baek, A Good Girl and original soundtrack 
Baek released her debut EP,
I'm Baek, on September 10, 2012, with a total of five tracks including the lead single "Sad Song". On September 16, Baek made her official debut stage on the music program Inkigayo with performed "Stay" and "Sad Song".

On December 15, Baek released  her first original soundtrack "Daddy Long Legs" for the SBS drama Cheongdam-dong Alice.

In April 2013, Baek recorded "Introduction to Love," for MBC's drama When a Man Falls in Love. Baek released her second EP, A Good Girl, on June 17, 2013, with the lead single "A Good Boy". One months later, she recorded "Tears Are Also Love", for the MBC's drama Goddess of Fire OST.

In May 2014, Baek released track, "The Three Things I Have Left", for the SBS drama Angel Eyes. Two months later, she released another track, "Morning of Canon", for MBC's drama You Are My Destiny.

2015–present: Breakthrough, Bittersweet, Dear Me, and Observe
Baek released her first single and first self-composed song, "Shouldn't Have" (featuring Day6's Young K), on May 20, 2015. The song went on to become a sleeper hit, reaching number one on several Korean music real-time charts a month after its release among fierce competition. Following the success of the song, she began promotions for it on music programs beginning with Show! Music Core on June 13. Later in the year, she contributed her vocals to the song "So We Are" for the SBS drama Yong-pal.

In May 2016, Baek released a digital single album, consisting of the lead track "So-So", composed and written by herself, as well as side track "Something to Say". "So-so" followed the success of "Shouldn't Have", securing the top spot on all major Korean music charts within a day of its release. Later that year, she released holiday single, "Just Because" (featuring Got7's JB), on November 30.

Baek's third EP, Bittersweet, was released on May 29, 2017, leading to the media coining the name "May Queen" for her consistency in releasing music during that month. The EP contained six tracks, with the lead single "Sweet Lies" featuring vocal trio The Barberettes. While Bittersweet did not have the same success chart-wise as its predecessors, the album was praised for its quality with Billboard including it among their top five critic's picks of the K-pop albums released that year."The album as a whole, is hypnotic in its pop glory, and lives up to Baek's reputation within Korea as one of the country's most captivating young female soloists. As a whole, Bittersweet features a wide array of sounds that blend to create an otherworldly listening experience."

- T.H., BillboardBaek A Yeon's fourth EP, Dear Me was released on November 21, 2018, with the lead single "Sorry To Myself" along with five other songs. Later that year, she was confirmed to have landed a role in Korea's first virtual reality (VR) musical film, "Anna, Mari", which won Korea Creative Content Agency's 2018 "VR Frontier Content Project".

On September 16, 2019, it was revealed that Baek A Yeon's contract with JYP Entertainment had come to an end. She chose not to renew her contract, and left the company. On December 7, she formally announced that she had joined Eden Entertainment.

On July 13, 2021, Baek A Yeon was supposed to release her fifth EP, Observe, with the lead single "0%", but it was delayed due to rising cases of COVID-19 in Korea.  It was later announced that the new release date would be September 7.

On August 17, 2022, Baek released the track "DOCTOR", a track that was included in the Pokémon Exhibition Track.

On October 21, 2022, it was announced that Baek has renewed her contract with Eden Entertainment.

Personal life 
On February 28, 2023, Baek’s agency confirmed that she is in a relationship with her non-celebrity boyfriend. On March 2, 2023, Baek announced in a handwritten letter that they will be holding their wedding ceremony.

Discography

Extended plays

Singles

Other charted songs

Soundtrack appearances

Concerts and tours

Headlining
Baek A Yeon 1st Concert "Whispering the First Story" (2015)
Baek A Yeon 2nd Concert "Whisper, Whisper - The 2nd Story" (2016)

Concert participation
 2014 JYP Nation ONE MIC (Seoul, Hong Kong, Tokyo and Bangkok)
 2016 JYP Nation Mix & Match (Seoul and Tokyo)

Filmography

Film

Variety programs

Music video appearance

Theatre

Awards and nominations

Notes

References

External links
 Official Website

1993 births
Living people
People from Seongnam
Howon University alumni
JYP Entertainment artists
K-pop singers
K-pop Star participants
Melon Music Award winners
South Korean female idols
South Korean women pop singers
South Korean rhythm and blues singers
21st-century South Korean women singers